I, Lucifer may refer to:
I, Lucifer (O'Donnell novel), an action-adventure novel by Peter O'Donnell
I, Lucifer (Duncan novel), a 2003 supernatural-fiction novel by Glen Duncan
I, Lucifer (Destroy the Runner album)
I, Lucifer (Real Tuesday Weld album)

See also
I Luciferi, an album by Danzig